Ratchathewi Intersection is a four-way intersection of Phaya Thai and Phetchaburi roads in the area of Thung Phaya Thai, Thanon Phaya Thai and Thanon Phetchaburi sub-districts, Ratchathewi district, downtown Bangkok. It's the location of Ratchathewi station close to important intersections viz Pratunam, Pathum Wan, Phaya Thai, Uruphong and Victory Monument. 

Its name means Royal Consort in honour of Sukhumala Marasri, who was one of four consorts of King Chulalongkorn (Rama V). When she was 50 years old, she donated her own money to build a bridge across a Khlong Pra Chae Chin (คลองประแจจีน; Pra Chae Chin canal). The King Vajiravudh (Rama VI) was presided over the opening ceremony on May 22, 1911 and was given the official name "Phra Ratchathewi Bridge" (สะพานพระราชเทวี) but generally called by short "Ratchathewi Bridge" (สะพานราชเทวี). Later, when the need to expand the traffic surface of Phetchaburi road. Bridge and canal were demolished to create a roundabout (traffic circle). Ratchathewi roundabout has a landmark, a large fountain and the roses are planted around for beauty, especially at night with spotlight. This makes the roundabout more beautiful. In that era, this neighbourhood is considered to be a busy and bustling place. It was surrounded by the houses of the wealthy and many nobles.

Later in the 1964, the roundabout was demolished to rebuild the intersection to alleviate traffic jams. The fountain was rebuilt into four fountains at the four corners of the intersection as in modern times. In the 1970s, Ratchathewi intersection became the shopping district of Bangkok. It's the center of many leading cinemas such as Athens, Mackenna, Hollywood, President, Paramount, Metro, Indra etc., including many beauty parlors.

In 1975, an overpass was constructed, completed in 1979 with the dozens of crushed rock trucks  parked on the bridge to test the strength. It's considered as the first overpass crossing intersection of Bangkok and still use today.

In 1989, when Bangkok was re-zoning. Ratchathewi area has been separated from Phaya Thai district. "Ratchathewi" is also used as a new district name.

References

Road junctions in Bangkok
Ratchathewi district